The Imam Khomeini Relief Foundation (Persian: کمیته‌ی امداد امام خمینی) is an Iranian charitable organization, founded in March 1979 to provide support for poor families. The aim is to help such families regain financial stability. IKRF has also provided support outside Iran, including in Pakistan, Somalia, Afghanistan, Palestine, Bosnia and Herzegovina, Kosovo, Chechnya, the Comoros, Iraq, Tajikistan, Azerbaijan, Syria, and Lebanon.

IKRF provides multiple forms of support to individuals and families. , a total of 8.6 million needy people have received aid from IKRF. 698 thousand families were covered in the Rajaei plan, which provides social security coverage for senior villagers and nomads without insurance. 1.5 million people below the poverty line received free insurance from IKRF and 843 thousand students received assistance for education.

Sources of funding

The foundation is supported by the Iranian government and also receives the Islamic taxes of Khums and Zakat, as well as Zakat al-fitr. Also, the foundation has charity boxes installed all across the country to gather donations.

History
The history of such committees goes back to 1964, 15 years before Iran's revolution. At that time, the objective of the smaller committee was to support the families of political prisoners.

See also
Bonyad

References

Charities based in Iran
Islamic relief organizations
1979 establishments in Iran
Foundations based in Iran
Revolutionary institutions of the Islamic Republic of Iran